Criolla is a genre of Cuban music which is closely related to the music of the Cuban Coros de Clave and a genre of Cuban popular music called Clave.

The Clave became a very popular genre in the Cuban vernacular theater and was created by composer Jorge Anckermann based on the style of the Coros de Clave. The Clave served, in turn, as a model for the creation of a new genre called Criolla. According to musicologist Helio Orovio, "Carmela", the first Criolla, was composed by Luis Casas Romero in 1909, which also created one of the most famous Criollas of all times, "El Mambí".

Like the Clave and the Guajira (music), the formal structure of the Criolla consist of a brief introduction, followed by two sections of 16 measures each. The first one in a minor tone, and the second one in its major direct relative.
The essential rhythm of the Criolla is the same as the one of the Clave, the Vertical Hemiola, which appears consistently in the base part of those songs. 

The Cuban traditional Trova singers also adopted the Clave and Criolla genres, which became part of their repertoire. Some famous composers of Criollas were: Jorge Anckermann (Linda criolla), Alberto Villalón (Quiero besarte) and Sindo Garay (Mujer bayamesa).

In spite of the fact that the basic structure of the Guajira (music), the Clave and the Criolla is almost identical, it is possible to observe a certain style evolution that may suggest a possible relationship in the development of those three genres. For example, the rhythmic pattern of the Vertical Hemiola does not appear in the first versions of the Guajira (music), so therefore it may have been included at a later time, maybe due to the influence of the Coros de Clave. Also the modulation style from a minor to a major mode, which already appears in the famous Guajira (music) "El arroyo que murmura" by Jorge Anckermann, varies in the posterior Criollas of Trovadores Sindo Garay and Manuel Corona, in which they utilize much more complex modulations than in previous versions.

References

See also
Music of Cuba

Cuban styles of music